Uchechukwu Uwakwe (born 3 July 1979) is a Nigerian former professional footballer who played as a midfielder or striker.

Career
Uwakwe started his career with Georgian side Dinamo (Batumi), becoming the first Black player to play in Georgia. Before the second half of 2001–02, Uwakwe signed for Tavriya in the Ukrainian top flight, where he made 16 appearances and scored 1 goal. In 2007, he signed for Norwegian fourth tier club Egersund. In 2011, Uwakwe founded and owned UC BEST, a team in Georgia.

References

External links

Living people
1979 births
Nigerian footballers
Association football forwards
Association football midfielders
Ukrainian Premier League players
Erovnuli Liga players
FC Dinamo Batumi players
SC Tavriya Simferopol players
Egersunds IK players
Nigerian expatriate footballers
Nigerian expatriate sportspeople in Georgia (country)
Expatriate footballers in Georgia (country)
Nigerian expatriate sportspeople in Norway
Expatriate footballers in Norway
Nigerian expatriate sportspeople in Ukraine
Expatriate footballers in Ukraine